Rino Vernizzi (15 November 1946 – 16 June 2022) was an Italian bassoonist.

Biography
Rino Vernizzi was born in Mezzano Inferiore, Italy. He graduated in bassoon at Parma Conservatory with Enzo Muccetti in 1967, then later gave himself up to the improvement of the piano with Paolo Cavazzini showing his interest since early career in jazz music, then abandoned to devote himself to the world of Symphony Orchestras.

Career
Vernizzi won many competitions, he played with several of the major Italian orchestras and for many years was the first bassoon of the Orchestra dell'Accademia Nazionale di Santa Cecilia in Rome. As a soloist he collaborated with conductors such as Giuseppe Sinopoli, Carlo Maria Giulini, Kurt Masur, Neville Marriner, Daniel Oren, and Daniele Gatti. He toured all over the world.

Vernizzi’s goal was always to explore the entire spectrum of music, not just the thread of classic European one, but also engaging, especially during hid the last decade, in other musical genres, particularly in jazz.

CDs recorded with his quartet: Etnoart Jazz Bassoon, Goldberg Jazz, Play Bach Paganini, Baby Boom, The quartet seasons, Storie di tango, Jazz Piano Trio, and Play Pixinguinha were greatly appreciated by the critics.

Discography 
 Goldberg Jazz – Play Bach, Play Paganini, Rino Vernizzi, Vernizzi Jazz Quartet, Arts.
 Baby Boom, Rino Vernizzi, Vernizzi Jazz Quartet, Italy.
 Bassoon XX (concert of Sofia Gubaidulina, Jean Françaix, André Jolivet etc.), Rino Vernizzi, Antonio Plotino, Arts.

References

Bibliography

External links
 

1946 births
2022 deaths
Italian musicians
Italian classical bassoonists
People from Mezzani